The women's doubles tennis event at the 2015 Summer Universiade was held from July 5 to 11 at the Jawol International Tennis Court in Gwangju, South Korea.

Han Na-lae and Lee So-ra of South Korea won the gold medal defeating Hsu Chieh-yu and Lee Ya-hsuan of Chinese Taipei in the final, 6–4, 6–4.

Erina Hayashi and Aiko Yoshitomi of Japan and Noppawan Lertcheewakarn and Varatchaya Wongteanchai of Thailand won the bronze medals.

Seeds
All seeds receive a bye into the second round.

Draw

Finals

Top half

Bottom half

References
Main Draw

Tennis at the 2015 Summer Universiade